Giulio Giacomo Castellani, O.S.A. (15 November 1619 – January, 1694) was a Roman Catholic prelate who served as Bishop of Cagli (1686–1694).

Biography
Giulio Giacomo Castellani was born in Urbino, Italy on 15 November 1619 and ordained a priest in the Order of Saint Augustine.
On 1 April 1686, he was appointed during the papacy of Pope Innocent XI as Bishop of Cagli. On 15 April 1686, he was consecrated bishop by Alessandro Crescenzi (cardinal), Cardinal-Priest of Santa Prisca, with Francesco Casati, Titular Archbishop of Trapezus, and Marcantonio Barbarigo, Archbishop of Corfù, serving as co-consecrators. He served as Bishop of Cagli until his death in January 1694.

See also
Catholic Church in Italy

References

External links and additional sources

17th-century Italian Roman Catholic bishops
Bishops appointed by Pope Innocent XI
1619 births
1694 deaths
Augustinian bishops